Ərziküş (also, Erzikyush) is a village in the Siazan Rayon of Azerbaijan.  The village forms part of the municipality of Yuxarı Ələz.

References 

Populated places in Siyazan District